Karim El-Khebir (alternatively spelled Karim El-Khebyr; born 4 May 1974 in Niger) is a Nigerien retired footballer who now works as head coach of NDC Angers reserves in his home country.

Career

El-Khebir started his senior career with Valenciennes in the 1990s. In 1999, he signed for ASOA Valence in the French Ligue 2, where he made over twenty-six appearances and scored over zero goals. After that, he played for Irish club St Patrick's Athletic and French club Sainte-Geneviève Sports before retiring.

References

External links 
 Un Jour, Un Bleu - Karim El Khebir 
 Cygan - El Khebir : comme on se retrouve 
 FOOTBALL: CLAUDE WAS THE KARIM OF THE CROP AT ACADEMY; PREMIER LEAGUE: SAINTS ACE TALKS OF FRIENDSHIP WITH FRANCE HERO El Khebyr still inspired by childhood mate Makelele 
 Football: EL KHEBYR IS STAYING 
 Eircom League: St Pat's won't get Karim-ed 
 Football: KHEBIR PASS IN THE CUP; ST PATS v BOHS 
 Football: Khebyr misses big day 
 Waterford chase El-Khebyr signature 
 at Footballdatabase.eu

1974 births
Living people
French footballers
Nigerien footballers
Nigerien expatriate footballers
French expatriate footballers
Expatriate footballers in Scotland
Association football defenders
Valenciennes FC players
ASOA Valence players
Expatriate association footballers in the Republic of Ireland
St Patrick's Athletic F.C. players
French people of Nigerien descent
LB Châteauroux players
Sainte-Geneviève Sports players